Salix alpina, the Alpine willow, is a species of flowering plant in the family Salicaceae, native to the Eastern Alps and the Carpatians, with one station in the Dinaric Alps. A creeping, mat-forming deciduous shrub, it is available in commerce. Its growth habit varies according to local conditions.

References

alpina
Flora of Germany
Flora of Austria
Flora of Poland
Flora of Czechoslovakia
Flora of Italy
Flora of Yugoslavia
Flora of Romania
Flora of Ukraine
Plants described in 1771